The Pictou Sessions is an album released by Seven Nations in 2000. Many of its tracks would be re-released on their follow-up self-titled album.

Track listing
1. "The King of Oblivion" (called "King of Oblivion" on "Seven Nations")
2. "Seeds of Life"
3. "Fiddle Set" (called "Jig in E Minor" on "Seven Nations")
4. "Scream"
5. "The Surprise Ceilidh Band Set"
6. "God"
7. "O'er the Moor and Among the Heather"
8. "All You People"
9. "Skyezinha / The Egret"
10. "A Rare Auld Time"
11. "Pipe Set" (called "The Pipe Set" on "Seven Nations")
12. "Trains"

Seven Nations (band) albums
2000 albums